Khalilah Camacho Ali (born Belinda Boyd; March 17, 1950) is an American actress, also known for being the former wife of boxer Muhammad Ali.

Personal life
Born Belinda Boyd on March 17, 1950, she was raised in Chicago where she attended Islamic schools. Her parents were members of the Nation of Islam. She claimed her paternal great-grandfather was from Karachi, Pakistan.

Boyd married Muhammad Ali on August 18, 1967, at the age of 17. She claims the marriage was arranged by her Muslim parents. In an interview with NBC 6, Boyd recounted meeting Ali when she was 10 years old at her hometown mosque. "He said, 'Listen here little girl. This is my name. Imma be famous. You need to keep that 'cause it's gone be worth a lot of money,'" Boyd said, mimicking Ali. “You'll never be famous with that name. And, I walked away," Boyd said.

After their marriage, she, like Ali, changed her name to Khalilah Ali, though she was still called Belinda by old friends and family. When Ali's evasion of the draft cost him his boxing title in 1967 (a decision later overturned by the Supreme Court), Khalilah supported him emotionally and financially. They had a tumultuous marriage with Ali's infidelities and she accused him of being an absentee father. In 1974, Ali began an affair with his future wife Veronica Porche which resulted in a confrontation between Khalilah and Veronica in Manila. In January 1977, Khalilah divorced Ali. After their bitter divorce she said, "I left him because he wasn't what he said he was, because of his lack of morals and disrespect to the family. I don't think he deserves the name Muhammad Ali, and I'm going to call him Cassius Clay from now on."

The couple had four children, Maryum "May May" (born 1968), twins Jamillah and Rasheda (born 1970), and Muhammad Ali Jr. (born 1972). During their marriage, Ali had multiple children from extramarital affairs including Miya in 1972, and Khaliah in 1974,. Rasheda married Robert Walsh and has two sons, Biaggio Ali Walsh (born in 1998) and Nico Ali Walsh (born 2000).

Khalilah remarried in the 1980s and divorced twice more.

Career
She studied karate, and by 1977, earned a third degree black belt. Khalilah studied under Jim Kelly and Steve Saunders. She eventually earned her ninth degree black belt.

She appeared on the cover of Ebony Magazine seven times. She appeared in the Jane Fonda film The China Syndrome.

References

External links

1950 births
Living people
20th-century American actresses
American film actresses
Lee Strasberg Theatre and Film Institute alumni
Muhammad Ali family
American Muslims
African-American Muslims
American people of Pakistani descent
Converts to Islam
Place of birth missing (living people)
American female karateka